Kushneria endophytica is an endophytic and plant growth promoting bacterium from the genus of Kushneria which has been isolated from the plant Arthrocnemum macrostachyum from the Odiel marshes in Spain.

References

Oceanospirillales
Bacteria described in 2018